"Walk Like a Man" is a song written by Bob Crewe and Bob Gaudio and originally recorded by the Four Seasons.

The Four Seasons's version
The song features the counterpoint of Nick Massi's bass voice and the falsetto of lead singer Frankie Valli. It was their third number one hit, initially reaching the top of the Billboard Hot 100 on March 2, 1963, remaining there for three weeks. "Walk Like a Man" also went to number three on the R&B singles chart.

Cash Box described it as "a feelingful, cha cha beat stomper ... that again sports the falsetto gimmick" and has an "ultra-commercial arrangement by Charles Calello".

During the sessions that produced the hit recording, the fire department received an emergency call from the Abbey Victoria Hotel (the building that housed the Stea-Phillips Recording Studios). As producer Bob Crewe was insisting upon recording the perfect take, smoke and water started to seep into the studio; the room directly above the studio was on fire, but Crewe had blocked the studio door. He continued recording until firemen used their axes on the door and pulled Crewe out.

Other versions
Other versions have been recorded by artists such as the Mary Jane Girls (1986), Divine (1985), Dreamhouse and Jan & Dean (1963) off the album Jan & Dean Take Linda Surfin. Plastic Bertrand did a version in French, entitled C'est Le Rock 'n' Roll (1978), Hungarian band Bon Bon recorded the song with the title Sexepilem (1999), and Chance & The Phantasmics (2012).

The song features prominently in the 1993 film Heart And Souls as well as the 1996 film Sleepers. It also features in the 1993 film Mrs. Doubtfire and is played during the opening credits of The Wanderers.

Personnel
Partial credits.

The Four Seasons
 Frankie Valli – lead vocals, handclaps
 Tommy DeVito – harmony and backing vocals, guitar, handclaps
 Nick Massi – harmony and backing vocals, bass, handclaps
 Bob Gaudio – harmony and backing vocals, piano, handclaps
Additional musician and production staff
 Panama Francis – drums
 Bob Crewe – producer
 unknown – engineer

Charts

Divine version

Divine recorded his version of "Walk Like a Man" which was released in 1985 as the lead single from the album Maid in England.

Track listing
 "Walk Like a Man" – 3:50
 "Man Talk" – 3:23

Charts

References

1963 songs
1963 singles
1985 singles
The Four Seasons (band) songs
Divine (performer) songs
Billboard Hot 100 number-one singles
Cashbox number-one singles
Number-one singles in New Zealand
Songs written by Bob Gaudio
Songs written by Bob Crewe
Vee-Jay Records singles
Song recordings produced by Bob Crewe
Jan and Dean songs
Mary Jane Girls songs